Kitano High School can refer to:
Osaka Prefectural Kitano High School
Tokyo Metropolitan Kitano High School, Now Tokyo Metropolitan Itabashi Yutoku High School